is a Japanese four-panel manga series written and illustrated by Fumita Yanagida about a tomboy high schooler who is in love with her childhood friend, who only treats her as a boy, and her attempts to make him reciprocate her feelings. It was serialized on the Twi4 Twitter account and Saizensen website from April 2015 to July 2019, and published in eight volumes. An anime television series adaptation by Lay-duce premiered in January 2023 and is co-produced by Crunchyroll with distribution outside of East Asia, with an English dub that premiered the same day.

Plot
Tomo Aizawa is a tomboy who has been head-over-heels in love with her childhood friend Junichiro Kubota for a long time, even though he only sees her as "one of the boys" and has no romantic feelings for her at all. Hilarity ensues when she tries many times in vain to win his heart, but almost always fails and even ends up getting physical at times.

Characters

Tomo is a tomboy who excels in combat sports. She is deeply in love with her childhood friend Junichiro, even though she struggles to win his heart. She is self-conscious about her masculine personality and seeks to become more feminine. She reflexively hits Junichiro whenever he does anything that could be perceived as physically intimate. She is in the school's karate club (all boys except for her), after not wanting to be further influenced by her father's personality during fights.

The handsome childhood friend whom Tomo is in love with. However, he only sees her as one of the boys, much to Tomo's frustration. He and Tomo are neighbors, with them first meeting when Junichiro moved into Tomo's neighborhood. However, they went to different elementary schools. He has been regularly training with Tomo's father's dojo, so he does not participate in any athletic programs at school. He feels a bit jealous whenever Tomo gives attention to other guys. He and Misuzu do not get along, having dated briefly back in middle school.
 

Tomo's best female friend, she is petite with dark hair with a side ponytail. Although she sometimes plays the straight man complement to Tomo and Junichiro, she is also very cunning and sadistic, often showing a devilish grin to Junichiro.  She likes to mess with the two, even telling classmate Tanabe that she is the only one who is allowed to play with them. Although she knows Tomo likes Junichiro, she does not like that they progress their relationship for fear of losing her friend to him.

 The school idol, she comes from a wealthy family, is of British descent, and has light blonde hair and a busty figure. Although she acts like an airhead and a free spirit, she is later revealed to be an excellent student. She is childhood friends and distant relatives with Kosuke, who she says they have been engaged and married three times over. Her mother was a young teenager when she gave birth to her. Tomo calls her cotton candy.

An upperclassman to Tomo and friends, he is the captain of the karate club and regarded as the school prince. He admires Tomo as an athlete and club member. He has a rocky relationship with his childhood friend and distant relative Carol, whom the latter says they are engaged.
   
 
 A pair of gyaru schoolgirls from class B. Mifune has light brown hair parted bangs and a short ponytail; Ogawa has short blonde hair pulled back in the middle, and a dark complexion. They both have a crush on Misaki, and try to call out Tomo to stay away from him, but after Tomo sees they like Misaki, she wants to support them as friends.

Another classmate of the trio. He has a crush on Misuzu, but is always rebuffed by her.

Tomo's father is a karate instructor who has trained both Tomo and Junichiro, hoping they can take over the family business.  He has an intense personality around the kids, but not so much when with his wife. He is the reason why Tomo cannot show her feminine side.
 
 
 Tomo's mother who she resembles although looks more tomboyish. She likes teasing her husband and daughter.

Media

Manga
Tomo-chan Is a Girl!, written and illustrated by Fumita Yanagida, was serialized on the Twi4 Twitter account and on the Saizensen website from April 7, 2015 to July 14, 2019. Kodansha published the individual chapters in eight tankōbon volumes.

In February 2018, Seven Seas Entertainment announced they licensed the series for an English release.

Volume list

Anime
An anime television series adaptation was announced at Anime Expo in July 2022. It is produced by Lay-duce and directed by Hitoshi Nanba, with assistant direction from Noriko Hashimoto, scripts written by Megumi Shimizu, character designs handled by Shiori Hiraiwa, and music composed by Masaru Yokoyama. The series premiered on January 5, 2023, on Tokyo MX and other networks. The series will consist of 13 episodes. Crunchyroll co-produced the series and is streaming it along with an English dub.

Episode list

Reception
As part of Anime News Network's Fall 2018 manga guide, Rebecca Silverman, Amy McNulty, Faye Hopper, and Teresa Navarro reviewed the first volume for the website. Silverman, McNulty, and Navarro praised the characters and art, while Hopper was more critical of the plot.

In 2016, the series won the Next Manga Award in the web manga category.

Notes

References

Citations

Works cited
 "Ch." and "Vol." are shortened forms for chapter and volume in the Tomo-chan Is a Girl! manga as presented in the tankobon volumes. 
 "Ep." is shortened form for episode and refers to an episode number of the Tomo-chan Is a Girl! anime.

External links
  
  
 

2023 anime television series debuts
Anime series based on manga
Aniplex
Crunchyroll anime
Japanese webcomics
Kodansha manga
Lay-duce
Romantic comedy anime and manga
School life in anime and manga 
Seinen manga
Seven Seas Entertainment titles
Slice of life anime and manga
Tokyo MX original programming
Webcomics in print
Yonkoma